The Fourth Succession War Military Atlas Volume 1 is a game supplement for BattleTech published by FASA in 1988.

Contents
The Fourth Succession War Military Atlas Volume 1 is a supplement which describes the Fourth succession war from Aug 3028 to Jan 3029.

Reception
Jake Thornton reviewed The Fourth Succession War Military Atlas Volume 1 for Games International magazine, and gave it 1 star out of 5 for rolegamers and 3 stars out of 5 for wargamers, and stated that "Sadly the whole book smacks of being written to a rather unimaginative formula. Unless you really don't have the time, or you simply must have everything FASA produce, I wouldn't recommend you buy it."

References

BattleTech supplements